The automotive industry in India is the fourth-largest by production in the world as per 2021 statistics. In 2022, India became fourth largest country in the world by valuation of automotive industry. As of 2022, India is the 3rd largest automobile market in the world, surpassing Japan and Germany in terms of sales.

Currently India's auto industry is worth of more than US$100 billion and contributes 8% of the country's total export and accounts for 2.3% of India's GDP. India's major automobile manufacturing companies includes Maruti Suzuki, Tata Motors, Ashok Leyland, Mahindra & Mahindra, Force Motors, Tractors and Farm Equipment Limited, Eicher Motors, Royal Enfield, Sonalika Tractors, Hindustan Motors, Hradyesh, ICML, Kerala Automobiles Limited,  Reva, Pravaig Dynamics, Premier, Tara International and Vehicle Factory Jabalpur.

History

In 1897, the first car ran on an Indian road. Through the 1930s, cars were imports only, and in small numbers.

An embryonic automotive industry emerged in India in the 1940s. Hindustan Motors was launched in 1942 building Morris products, long-time competitor Premier in 1944, building Chrysler Corporation products such as Dodge and Plymouth, and beginning in the 1960's,  Fiat products. Mahindra & Mahindra was established by two brothers in 1945, and began assembly of Jeep CJ-3A utility vehicles. In the same years, J. R. D. Tata, the chairman of Tata Group founded TATA Engineering and Locomotive Company (now Tata Motors) in Jamshedpur. Following independence in 1947, the Government of India and the private sector launched efforts to create an automotive-component manufacturing industry to supply to the automobile industry. In 1953, an import substitution programme was launched, and the import of fully built-up cars began to be restricted.

1947–1970

The 1952 Tariff Commission
In 1952, the government appointed the first Tariff Commission, one of whose purposes was to come out with a feasibility plan for the indigenization of the Indian automobile industry. In 1953, the commission submitted their report, which recommended categorizing existing Indian car companies according to their manufacturing infrastructure, with licensed capacity to manufacture a certain number of vehicles, with capacity increases allowable, as per demands, in the future. The Tariff Commission recommendations were implemented with new policies that would eventually exclude companies that only imported parts for assembly, as well as those with no Indian partner. In 1954, following the Tariff Commission implementation, General Motors, Ford, and Rootes Group, which had assembly-only plants in Mumbai, decided to move out of India.

The Tariff commission policies, including similar restrictions that applied to other industries, came to be known as the Licence Raj, which proved to be the greatest undoing of the Indian automotive industry, where bureaucratic red tape ended up causing demand to outstrip supply, with month-long waiting periods for cars, scooters, and motorcycles.

Passenger cars
Hindustan Motors was established in Kolkata in technical collaboration with Morris Motors to manufacture Morris Oxford models that would later become HM Ambassador. 
 Addisons, Madras – An Amalgamations Group company, was the agent for Nuffield's Morris, Wolseley, and Riley cars, and Chrysler's Plymouth, Dodge, and De Soto cars and trucks. The first Morris Minor assembled in India and the first car assembled in Madras was driven out from Addison's twin-plants on Smith Road by Anantharamakrishnan on 15 November 1950.
Premier Automobiles, Mumbai – entered into technical collaboration with Chrysler to manufacture Dodge, Plymouth and Desoto models and with Fiat to manufacture the 1100D models which would later become Premier Padmini range.
 Standard Motor Products of India, Madras – entered into technical collaboration from Standard-Triumph to manufacture Standard Vanguard, Standard 8, 10 and later Standard Herald.

Utility and light commercial vehicles
Vehicle Factory Jabalpur – started manufacturing Jonga Light Utility Vehicles and Vahan 1 Ton (Nissan 4W73 Carriers) in India, under license from Nissan of Japan. They were the main troop carriers of the Indian Armed Forces and much powerful than any other vehicle of their class.Also Nissan Power Wagon was added to their line.
Mahindra & Mahindra plant established in Mumbai – technical collaboration with Willys to manufacture CJ Series Jeep. 
Bajaj Tempo, Pune, now Force Motors – entered into technical collaboration with Tempo to manufacture Tempo Hanseat, a three-wheeler and Tempo Viking and Hanomag, later known as Tempo Matador in India.
Standard Motor Products of India – entered into technical collaboration from Standard and had licence to manufacture the Standard Atlas passenger van with panel van and one-tonne pickup variants.

 

Medium and heavy commercial vehicles
Tata Motors established a new plant in Pune with technical collaboration with Mercedes Benz to manufacture medium to heavy commercial vehicles both Bus and Trucks.
Vehicle Factory Jabalpur started manufacturing Shaktiman trucks with technical assistance from MAN SE of Germany. The trucks were the main logistics vehicle of the Indian Army with several specialist variants. VFJ still is the sole supplier of B vehicles to the Indian Armed Forces.
 Heavy Vehicles Factory was established in 1965 in Avadi near Chennai to produce tanks in India. Since its inception, HVF has produced all the tanks of India, including Vijayanta, Arjun, Ajeya, Bhishma and their variants for the Indian Army. HVF is the only tank manufacturing facility of India.
Ashok Leyland was founded in Chennai with Leyland Motors to manufacture medium to heavy commercial vehicles both Bus and Trucks. Ashok Motors also discontinued its Austin venture formed in 1948 to sell Austin A40 and retooled the factory to make trucks and buses. 
Hindustan Motors – had technical collaboration with General Motors to manufacture the Bedford range of medium lorry and bus chassis. 
Premier Automobiles – entered into technical collaboration with Chrysler to manufacture the Dodge, Fargo range of medium lorry, panel vans, mini-bus and bus chassis. 
Simpsons & Co, Madras – part of Amalgamations Group (TAFE Tractors) – had technical collaboration with Ford to manufacture medium lorry and bus chassis, but did not utilise that option until the 1980s.+

Scooters, mopeds and motorcycles
Many of the two-wheelers manufacturers were granted licenses in the early 1960s, well after the tariff commission was enabled. 
 Royal Enfield (India), Madras – had technical collaboration with Royal Enfield, UK to manufacture the Enfield Bullet range of motorcycles.
 Bajaj Auto, Poona – had technical collaboration with Piaggio, Italy to manufacture their best selling Vespa range of scooters and three wheelers with commercial option as well. 
TVS Motors, Madurai/Chennai - started individually and later had technical collaboration with Suzuki Motors, before finally buying them out of the JV.
 Automobile Products of India, Bombay (Better known for API Lambretta) – had technical collaboration with Innocenti of Milan, Italy to manufacture their Lambretta range of mopeds, scooters and three-wheelers. This company was actually the Rootes Group car plant that was bought over by M. A. Chidambaram family.
 Mopeds India Limited, Tirupathi – had technical collaboration with Motobécane, France to manufacture their best selling Mobylette mopeds.
 Escorts Group, New Delhi – had technical collaboration with CEKOP of Poland to manufacture the Rajdoot 175 motorcycle whose origin was DKW RT 125.
 Ideal Jawa, Mysore – entered into technical collaboration with CZ - Jawa of Czechoslovakia for its Jawa and Yezdi range of motorcycles.

However, growth was relatively slow in the 1950s and 1960s, due to nationalisation and the license raj, which hampered the growth of the Indian private sector.

1970 to 1983
The beginning of the 1970s didn't see growth potential; and most of the collaboration license agreements came to an end, but with the option to continue manufacturing with renewed branding. Cars were still meant for the elite and Jeeps, now owned by American Motors Corporation, were largely used by government organizations and in some rural regions. By the end of the decade, some developments were made in commercial vehicle segments to facilitate the movement of goods. The two-wheeler segment remained unchanged except for to increased sales to the middle class in urban areas. There was emphasis on having more farm tractors, as India was embarking on a new Green Revolution; and Russian and eastern bloc imports were brought in to meet the demand.

But after 1970, with restrictions on the import of vehicles set, the automotive industry started to grow; but the growth was mainly driven by tractors, commercial vehicles and scooters. Cars still remained a major luxury item. In the 1970s, price controls were finally lifted, inserting a competitive element into the automobile market. However, by the 1980s, the automobile market was still dominated by Hindustan and Premier, who sold superannuated products in fairly limited numbers. The rate of car ownership in 1981 was about one in every thousand citizens – understandable when the annual road tax alone cost about half the average income of an Indian at the time.

During the eighties, a few competitors began to arrive on the scene. Of the 30,487 cars built in India in 1980, all but six came from the two main players Hindustan and Premier: Standard had led a shadow existence in the latter half of the 1970s, producing only a handful of cars to keep their license active. A new contender was tiny Sipani, which had tried building locally developed three-wheeled vehicles since 1975 but introduced the Reliant Kitten-based Dolphin in 1982. Nonetheless, all eyes were on Maruti, which caused a major upheaval to the Indian automobile industry.

The OPEC oil crisis saw increase need to installing or redesign some vehicle to fit diesel engines on medium commercial vehicle. Until the early 1970s Mahindra Jeeps were on Petrol and Premier commercial vehicles had Petrol model options. The Defence sector too had most trucks on Petrol engines.

1984 to 1992

From the end of the 1970s to the beginning of the 1980s India saw no new models, the country continuing to depend on two decades-old designs. The Sipani Dolphin, which arrived in 1982, was not a serious contender, with its plastic body and without rear doors - essential to Indian car buyers. This situation forced the government to encourage and let more manufacturers into fray.

In 1984, the Ordnance Factory Medak near Hyderabad was established. It started manufacturing Infantry Combat Vehicles christened as Sarath, the backbone of India's mechanised infantry. OFMK is still the only manufacturing facility of ICVs in India. To manufacture the high-power engines used in ICVs and main battle tanks, Engine Factory Avadi, near Chennai was set in 1987. In 1986, to promote the auto industry, the government established the Delhi Auto Expo. The 1986 Expo was a showcase for how the Indian automotive industry was absorbing new technologies, promoting indigenous research and development, and adapting these technologies for the rugged conditions of India.

Post-1992 liberalisation

Eventually multinational automakers, such as, Suzuki and Toyota of Japan and Hyundai of South Korea, were allowed to invest in the Indian market, furthering the establishment of an automotive industry in India. Maruti Suzuki was the first, and the most successful of these new entries, and in part the result of government policies to promote the automotive industry beginning in the 1980s. As India began to liberalise its automobile market in 1991, a number of foreign firms also initiated joint ventures with existing Indian companies. The variety of options available to the consumer began to multiply in the nineties, whereas before there had usually only been one option in each price class. By 2000, there were 12 large automotive companies in the Indian market, most of them offshoots of global companies.

Slow export growth
Exports were slow to grow. Sales of small numbers of vehicles to tertiary markets and neighbouring countries began early, and in 1987 Maruti Suzuki shipped 480 cars to Europe (Hungary). After some growth in the mid-nineties, exports once again began to drop as the outmoded platforms provided to Indian manufacturers by multinationals were not competitive. This was not to last, and today India manufactures low-priced cars for markets across the globe. As of 18 March 2013, global brands such as Proton Holdings, PSA Group, Kia, Mazda, Chrysler, Dodge and Geely Holding Group were shelving plans for India due to the competitiveness of the market, as well as the global economic crisis.

Emission norms
In 2000, in line with international standards to reduce vehicular pollution, the central government unveiled standards titled "India 2000", with later, upgraded guidelines to be known as Bharat Stage emission standards. These standards are quite similar to the stringent European emission standards and have been implemented in a phased manner.

Bharat Stage IV (BS-IV), the most stringent so far, was implemented first, in April 2010, in 13 cities—Delhi (NCR), Mumbai, Kolkata, Chennai, Bangalore, Hyderabad, Ahmedabad, Pune, Surat, Kanpur, Lucknow, Solapur, and Agra—and then, as of April 2017, the rest of the nation.

In 2019, in line with international standards to reduce vehicular pollution, the central government of India announced the introduction of BS-VI norms to control air pollution, taking effect from 1 April 2020.

Local manufacture encouraged

India levies an import tax of 125% on foreign imported cars, while the import tax on components such as gearboxes, airbags, drive axles, is 10%. Therefore, the taxes encourage cars to be assembled in India rather than be imported as completely built units.

Sub-4-metre rule 
In 2006, the government of India imposed a new tax structure, which massively impacted the segment. The model became significantly cheaper, becoming one of the largest selling three-box cars in the country. Other manufacturers quickly adapted, which led to the release of the shorter Suzuki Swift Dzire, the new Honda Brio Amaze, and others.

Manufacturing facilities
The majority of India's car manufacturing industry is evenly divided into three "clusters". Around Chennai is the southernmost and largest, with a 35% revenue share, accounting for 60% of the country's automotive exports, and home of the operations of Heavy Vehicles Factory, Engine Factory Avadi, Ford, Hyundai, Renault, Mitsubishi, Nissan, BMW, Hindustan Motors, Daimler, Caparo, Mini, Citroën and Datsun.

Near Mumbai, Maharashtra, along the Chakan corridor near Pune, is the western cluster, with a 33% share of the market. Audi, Volkswagen, and Škoda are located in Aurangabad. Mahindra and Mahindra has an SUV and engine assembly plant at Nashik. General Motors, Tata Motors, Mercedes Benz, Land Rover, Jaguar, Fiat, and Force Motors have assembly plants in the area.

The northern cluster is around the National Capital Region, and contributes 30%. Gurgaon and Manesar, in Haryana, are where the country's largest car manufacturer, Maruti Suzuki, is based.

An emerging cluster is the state of Gujarat, with a manufacturing facility of MG Motors in Halol, Atul Auto in Rajkot, Ford, Oculus Auto in Sabarkantha, Maruti Suzuki, and Peugeot-Citroën plants are also planned for Gujarat.

Uttarakhand with Tata Motors, Telangana with Hyundai, Ordnance Factory Medak, Hyderabad Allwyn and Mahindra & Mahindra, Noida with Honda, and Bengaluru - Karnataka region with Toyota, Volvo and Scania, Andhra with Isuzu and Kia and Kolkata - Jamshedpur belt also known as East India belt with companies such as Hindustan Motors, Heavy Engineering Corporation, Tata Hitachi Construction Machinery, TIL Tractos, Tata Daewoo and Tata Motors are other automotive manufacturing regions around the country.

Andhra Pradesh
Commercial and passenger vehicles
 Isuzu Motors India – Sri City
 Kia India – Penukonda (Anantapur)
 Ashok Leyland - Vijayawada
Two wheelers
 Hero MotoCorp – Satyavedu
Off-highway vehicles
 Kobelco Cranes – Sri City

Gujarat
Passenger vehicles
 Tata Motors – Sanand
 Suzuki Motor – Ahmedabad
 MG Motor – Halol 
Two wheelers
 Hero MotoCorp – Surat
 Honda Motorcycle & Scooter India – Ahmedabad

Commercial vehicles
 Asia Motor Works – Bhuj
 Atul Auto – Rajkot
 Oculus Auto – Sabarkantha

Haryana
Two wheelers
 Hero MotoCorp – Dharuhera, Gurgaon
 Honda Motorcycle & Scooter India – Manesar
 India Yamaha Motor – Faridabad
 Suzuki – Gurugram
Passenger vehicles
 Maruti Suzuki – Gurugram, Manesar

Commercial vehicles
 JCB India – Faridabad
 Omega Seiki Mobility – Faridabad

Agricultural Vehicles
 Escorts Group – Faridabad
 Kubota Corporation – Faridabad

Himachal Pradesh
Two wheelers
 TVS Motor – Nalagarh
Passenger vehicles
 ICML motors – Amb
Commercial vehicles
 TAFE Tractors – Parwanoo

Jharkhand
Commercial vehicles
 Tata Motors – Jamshedpur

Karnataka
Two wheelers
 TVS Motor – Mysuru
 Honda Motorcycle & Scooter India Pvt. Ltd. - Narsapura

Passenger vehicles
 Mahindra Reva Electric Vehicles – Bengaluru
 Toyota Kirloskar Motor Private Limited – Bidadi

Commercial vehicles
 Bharat Earth Movers - Bengaluru & Mysuru
 Scania Commercial Vehicles India Private Limited – Bengaluru
 TAFE Tractors – Doddaballapur
 Tata Motors – Dharwad
 VE Commercial Vehicles Limited - Bengaluru

Kerala
Commercial vehicles
 Bharat Earth Movers –   Palakkad
 Kerala Automobiles Limited – Thiruvananthapuram

Madhya Pradesh
Two wheelers
 Mahindra & Mahindra – Pithampur

Commercial vehicles
 Vehicle Factory –  Jabalpur
 Eicher Motors – Pithampur
 Hindustan Motors – Pithampur
 Force Motors Private Limited – Pithampur
 TAFE Tractors – Mandideep
 John Deere Tractors – Dewas
 CASE Construction Equipment - Pithampur

Maharashtra
Two wheelers
 Bajaj Auto – Chakan (Pune) & Waluj, Aurangabad
 KTM Sportmotorcycles – Chakan (Pune)
 India Kawasaki Motors – Chakan (Pune)
 Vespa Scooters – Baramati (Pune)
Passenger vehicles
 Mahindra & Mahindra Automotive Division – Nashik, Chakan (Pune)
 Tata Motors Limited
 Tata Motors – Pimpri Chinchwad (Pune)
 Jaguar Cars – Pimpri Chinchwad (Pune) Pune
 Land Rover - Pimpri Chinchwad, (Pune).
 Mercedes-Benz Passenger Cars – Chakan (Pune)
 Jeep India – Ranjangaon (Pune)
 Volkswagen Group Sales India Private Limited (Pune)
 Volkswagen – Chakan (Pune)
 Skoda Auto - Chakan (Pune), Shendra, Aurangabad
 Audi AG – Shendra, Aurangabad
Commercial vehicles
 Ashok Leyland – Bhandara
 Bajaj Auto (Pune) – Waluj, Aurangabad
 Force Motors – Chakan (Pune)
 Mahindra Navistar – Chakan, (Pune)
 Piaggio Vehicles – Baramati (Pune)
 Eicher (VE Commercial Vehicles Ltd.) – Thane.
 Sany India – (Pune).
 Hyundai Construction Equipment – Chakan (Pune).
 Caterpillar –  Banda, Sindhudurg.
 John Deere Tractors – Sanaswadi (Pune).
 Dynapac Road Construction – Phulgaon (Pune)
 Wirtgen India pvt ltd, bhandgav (pune ) (Road construction)

Punjab
Commercial vehicles
 SML Isuzu  – Nawanshahar 
 Swaraj Tractors – Mohali.
 Sonalika Tractor – Hoshiarpur
 Preet Tractor – Nabha
 Standard Tractors – Barnala

Rajasthan
 Two Wheelers
 Honda Motorcycle & Scooter India – Tapukara
 Hero Motocorp – Neemrana
 Okinawa Autotech
Passenger vehicles
 Honda Cars India Ltd. – Tapukara
Commercial vehicles
 Ashok Leyland – Alwar
 TAFE Tractors – Alwar

Tamil Nadu
Two wheelers
 TVS Motor – Hosur
BMW Motorrad – Hosur
 Royal Enfield – Chennai
 India Yamaha Motor – Oragadam, Chennai
 Ola Electric – Krishnagiri  
 Ather Energy – Hosur
 Simple Energy – Hosur
 Ampere Electric – Ranipet, Chennai
 Sri Varu Motors – Coimbatore
 Boom Motors - Coimbatore
Raptee Energy - Chennai
Aventose Energy - Chennai

Passenger vehicles
 BMW India – Mahindra World City, New Chennai
 MINI India – Mahindra World City, New Chennai
 Hyundai Motor India Limited – Sriperumbudur, Chennai
 Renault Nissan Automotive India Private Limited
 Nissan Motor India Private Limited – Oragadam, Chennai
 Renault India Private Limited – Oragadam, Chennai
 Datsun – Oragadam, Chennai
 Citroën India – Tiruvallur, Chennai
BYD India Pvt. Ltd – Sriperumbudur, Chennai
New Energy Wagon Pvt. Ltd - Tiruppur
Commercial vehicles

 Schwing Stetter India – Chennai
 Komatsu India Private Limited – Oragadam, Chennai
Daimler India Commercial Vehicles Private Limited – Oragadam, Chennai
Caterpillar – Tiruvallur, Chennai
 Heavy Vehicles Factory – Avadi, Chennai
 Ashok Leyland Limited 
 Ennore, Chennai – trucks, buses, engines, axles etc.
 Hosur – three adjacent plants (Hosur-1, Hosur-2, CPPS) for trucks, special vehicles and power units.
 Sengadu Village, Kanchipuram – technical and production facility for Ashok Leyland Defence Systems
 KamAZ Vectra Motors – Hosur
 VST Tillers Tractors Ltd – Hosur
 SAME Deutz-Fahr Tractors – Ranipet, Vellore
 TAFE Tractors – Chennai, Madurai
 TVS Motor – Hosur
 Force Motors – Chennai 
 Terex India Private Limited – Hosur 
 Doosan Bobcat India Private Limited – Chennai 
 Mauto Electric Mobility Pvt. Ltd – Chennai
 E Royce Motors India Pvt Ltd – Coimbatore
 REEP Motors – Maraimalai Nagar, Chennai
DP Auto India Pvt Ltd - Tiruchirapalli

Telangana
Defence
 Ordinance Factory – Medak

Commercial vehicles
 Hyundai – Hi Tech city
 Mahindra and Mahindra – Zaheerabad
 Deccan auto Limited – Patancheru

Uttar Pradesh
Two wheelers
 India Yamaha Motor – Greater Noida

Commercial vehicles
 Tata Motors – Lucknow
 New Holland – Greater Noida
J.S. Auto (P) LTD. – Kanpur

Uttarakhand
Commercial vehicles
 Ashok Leyland – Pantnagar
 Tata Motors – Pantnagar
 Mahindra & Mahindra – Haridwar

Two wheelers
 Hero MotoCorp – Haridwar
 Bajaj Auto – Pantnagar

West Bengal
Commercial vehicles
 Tata Hitachi Construction Machinery – Kharagpur

Exports

India's automobile exports have grown consistently and reached $4.5 billion in 2009, with the United Kingdom being India's largest export market, followed by Italy, Germany, the Netherlands, and South Africa.

According to The New York Times, India's strong engineering base and expertise in the manufacturing of low-cost, fuel-efficient cars has resulted in the expansion of manufacturing facilities of several automobile companies like Hyundai, Nissan, Toyota, Volkswagen, and Maruti Suzuki.

In 2008, South Korean multinational Hyundai Motors alone exported 240,000 cars made in India. Nissan Motors planned to export 250,000 vehicles manufactured in its India plant by 2011. Similarly, US automobile company, General Motors had announced its plans to export about 50,000 cars manufactured in India by 2011.

In September 2009, Ford Motors announced its plans to set up a plant in India with an annual capacity of 250,000 cars, for US$500 million. The cars were manufactured both for the Indian market and for export. The company said that the plant was a part of its plan to make India the hub for its global production business. Fiat Motors had announced that it would source more than US$1 billion worth auto components from India.

In 2009, India (0.23m) surpassed China (0.16m) as Asia's fourth largest exporter of cars after Japan (1.77m), Korea (1.12m) and Thailand (0.26m).

In July 2010, The Economic Times reported that PSA Peugeot Citroën was planning to re-enter the Indian market and open a production plant in Andhra Pradesh that would have an annual capacity of 100,000 vehicles, investing €700M in the operation. PSA's intention to utilise this production facility for export purposes however remains unclear as of December 2010.

In recent years, India has emerged as a leading center for the manufacture of small cars. Hyundai, the biggest exporter from the country, now ships more than 250,000 cars annually from India. Apart from Maruti Exports' shipments to Suzuki's other markets, Maruti Suzuki also manufactures small cars for Nissan, which sells them in Europe. Nissan will also export small cars from its new Indian assembly line. Tata Motors exports its passenger vehicles to Asian and African markets, and is preparing to sell electric cars in Europe in 2010. The firm is planning to sell an electric version of its affordable car the Tata Nano in Europe and in the U.S. In the 2000s, Mahindra & Mahindra prepared to introduce its pickup trucks and small SUV models in the U.S. market, but canceled its plans. As of 2019, it is assembling and selling an off-road vehicle (Mahindra Roxor; not certified for road use) in limited numbers in the U.S. It is also sold in Canada. Bajaj Auto is designing a low-cost car for Renault Nissan Automotive India, which will market the product worldwide. Renault Nissan may also join domestic commercial vehicle manufacturer Ashok Leyland in another small car project. While the possibilities for the Indian automobile industry are impressive, there are challenges that could thwart future growth. Since the demand for automobiles in recent years is directly linked to overall economic expansion and rising personal incomes, industry growth will slow if the economy weakens.

Top 10 export destinations

India exported $14.5 billion worth of automobiles in 2014. The 10 countries below imported 47.8% of that total.

Exports of Vehicles in India decreased to 1478.68 USD Million in 2020 from 11332.49 USD Million in 2019.

Passenger vehicle manufacturers in India

India is the 4th largest passenger vehicle producer in the world. In 2018–19, it produced 4.06 million cars. Currently, there are an estimated 30 million cars in India.

This list is of cars that are officially available and serviced in India.

Indian brands

Models currently manufactured by Indian brands

 Mahindra: Bolero, Scorpio, Thar, Bolero Neo, KUV100NXT, Marazzo, Alturas G4, XUV300, XUV700
 Tata Motors: Xenon, Tiago, Tigor, Tigor EV, Nexon, Nexon EV, Harrier, Altroz, Safari, Punch
 Force Motors: Force Gurkha

Defunct Indian brands
 Hindustan Motors - the company still exists, but no longer manufactures automobiles
 Sipani Automobiles
 Standard Motor Products of India Limited

Joint-venture (JV) brands
 Maruti Suzuki (subsidiary of Japanese auto maker Suzuki) Alto, Wagon R, Swift, Dzire, Ertiga, Celerio, Ciaz, Brezza, Baleno, Ignis, XL6, S-Presso, Grand Vitara, Jimny

Foreign-owned brands
MG, Hyundai, Renault, Nissan, Citroën, Jeep, Honda, Toyota, KIA, Volkswagen, Škoda, Audi, Jaguar, Land Rover, Mercedes-Benz, BMW and MINI are the foreign automotive companies that manufacture and market their products in India.

Vehicles currently manufactured in India
 Audi India: A4, A6, Q5, Q7
 BMW India: 3 Series, 5 Series, X1, X3, X4, X5, X7
 Citroën India: C3, C5 Aircross
 Honda Cars India: Amaze, City
 Hyundai Motor India: Grand i10 Nios, i20, Alcazar, Aura, Creta, Kona Electric, Tucson, Venue, Verna
 Isuzu Motors India: D-Max
 Jaguar (subsidiary of Tata Motors): XE, XF
 Jeep: Compass, Meridian, Wrangler
 Kia India: Carens, Carnival, Seltos, Sonet
 Land Rover (subsidiary of Tata Motors): Range Rover Evoque
 MG: Astor, Gloster, Hector, ZS EV
 Mercedes-Benz India: C-Class, E-Class, S-Class, V-Class, GLC-Class, GLE-Class
 MINI: Countryman
 Nissan Motor India: Magnite
 Renault India: Kiger, Kwid, Triber
 Škoda Auto India: Kushaq, Kodiaq, Slavia
 Toyota Kirloskar Motor: Innova Crysta, Fortuner, Camry, Glanza, Belta (exports only), Rumion (exports only), Urban Cruiser Hyryder, Hilux, Vitz (exports only),  Lexus ES300h
 Volkswagen India: Virtus, Taigun, Tiguan

Peugeot stopped selling passenger cars in India in 1997.

Daewoo Motors stopped selling passenger cars in India in 2003. 

Opel was present in India until 2006. As of 2013, Opel only provides spare parts and vehicle servicing to existing Opel vehicle owners.

General Motors India stopped producing Chevrolet passenger cars for the Indian market in late 2017.

Fiat left the Indian market in 2018. 

Mitsubishi Motors stopped selling passenger cars in India in the late 2010s. 

Ford India stopped producing passenger cars for the Indian market in late 2021.

Nissan stopped selling Datsun passenger cars in India in 2022.

Statistics

Auto companies

Indian brands
 AMW
 Ashok Leyland
 Atul Auto
 Oculus Auto
 Bajaj Auto
 Eicher Motors
 Force
Hindustan Motors
 Mahindra & Mahindra
 Premier
 Tata Motors
 Omega Seiki Mobility
 Maruti Suzuki

Joint-venture (JV) brands
 Ashok Leyland - originally a JV between Ashok Motors (owned by the Hinduja Group) and Leyland Motors, now joint ventures between Ashok Leyland and Nissan Motors (Japan) for LCV's; and John Deere (USA) for construction equipment.
 KamAZ Vectra - A JV between Russia's KamAZ and the Vectra Group
 MAN Force - A JV between Force Motors and MAN AG (Germany)
 SML Isuzu - originally, as Swaraj Mazda, a JV between Punjab Tractors and Mazda, now 53.5% owned by Sumitomo Group and with its current name since 2011.
 VE Commercial Vehicles Limited - VE Commercial Vehicles limited - A JV between Volvo Group and Eicher Motors Limited.

Foreign-owned brands
 BharatBenz (Owned by Daimler AG of Germany and affiliated with Daimler's Fuso and Mercedes-Benz brands)
 Caterpillar Inc.
 DAF
 Hino
 Isuzu
 Iveco
 J. C. Bamford (JCB) (Owned by British multinational corporation J. C. Bamford).
 KamAZ
 MAN
 Mercedes-Benz - manufactures luxury coaches in India.
 Piaggio
 Rosenbauer.
 Scania
 Tatra.
 Volvo.

Defunct commercial vehicle manufacturers of India

 Automobile Products of India or API - founded in 1949 at Bombay (now Mumbai), by the British company Rootes Group, and later bought by M. A. Chidambaram of the MAC Group from Madras (now Chennai). The company manufactured Lambretta scooters, API Three Wheelers under licence from Innocenti of Italy and automobile ancillaries, notably clutch and braking systems.  API's registered offices were earlier in Mumbai, later shifted to Chennai, in Tamil Nadu.  The manufacturing facilities were located in Mumbai and Aurangabad in Maharashtra and in Ambattur, Chennai. The company has not been operational since 2002.
 Escorts Yamaha - in 1984 Escorts formed a joint venture with Yamaha to manufacture motorcycles. In 2008 became India Yamaha Motor.
 Hero Motors is a former moped and scooter manufacturer based in Delhi, India.  It is a part of multinational company Hero Group, which also currently owns Hero Motocorp (formerly Hero Honda) and Hero Cycles, among others.  Hero Motors was started in the 1960s to manufacture 50cc two-stroke mopeds but gradually diversified into making larger mopeds, mokicks and scooters in the 1980s and the 1990s.  Noteworthy collaborators and technical partners were Puch of Austria and Malaguti of Italy.  Due to tightening emission regulations and poor sales, Hero motors have discontinued the manufacture of all gasoline powered vehicles and transformed itself into an electric two-wheeler and auto parts manufacturer.
 Ideal Jawa -  motorcycle company based in Mysore, sold licensed Jawa and ČZ motorcycles beginning in 1960 under the brand name Jawa and later Yezdi.
 Kinetic Honda - a joint venture between Kinetic Engineering Limited, India and Honda Motor Company, Japan. The joint venture operated during 1984 - 1998, manufacturing 2-stroke scooters in India.  In 1998, the joint venture was terminated after which Kinetic Engineering continued to sell the models under the brand name Kinetic until 2008 when the interests were sold to Mahindra. 
 Mopeds India Limited - produces the Suvega range of Mopeds under technical collaboration with Motobécane of France.
 Standard - produced by Standard Motor Products in Madras from 1949 to 1988.  Indian Standards were variations of vehicles made in the U.K. by Standard-Triumph.Standard Motor Products of India Ltd. (SMPI) was incorporated in 1948, and their first product was the Vanguard, which began to be assembled in 1949.  The company was dissolved in 2006 and the old plant torn down.
 Tatra Vectra - Initial truck partnership with India by Vectra. Replaced by KamAZ. Tatra trucks for sale in India are now manufactured in collaboration with Bharat Earth Movers Limited.

Electric vehicle and Hybrid vehicle (xEV) industry

During April 2012, the Indian government planned to unveil the road map for the development of domestic electric and hybrid vehicles (xEV) in the country. A discussion between the various stakeholders, including Government, industry, and academia, was expected to take place during 23–24 February. The final contours of the policy would have been formed after this set of discussions. Ministries such as Petroleum, Finance, Road Transport, and Power are involved in developing a broad framework for the sector. Along with these ministries, auto industry executives, such as Anand Mahindra (Vice Chairman and managing director, Mahindra & Mahindra) and Vikram Kirloskar (Vice-chairman, Toyota Kirloskar), were involved in this task. The Government has also proposed to set up a Rs 740 crore research and development fund for the sector in the 12th five-year plan during 2012–17. The idea is to reduce the high cost of key imported components such as the battery and electric motor, and to develop such capabilities locally. In the year 2017, An Amaravati, Andhra Pradesh based Electric Vehicles manufacturing company called AVERA New & Renewable Energy started electric scooters manufacturing and are ready to launch their two models of scooters by the end of December 2018.

Electric cars are seen as economical long-term investments, as one doesn't need to purchase gas, but needs only to recharge the battery, using renewable energy sources. According to the United States Department of Energy, electric cars produce half as much  emissions as compared to a gas-powered car. According to The Economic Times, 60% of Indian customers expect fuel prices to go up in the next 12 months and 58% expect to buy a new car in the same time frame. Most consumers are looking to buy a car which gives good mileage. According to the same source, 68% of Asian drivers expect higher mileage from their cars due to the higher fuel prices. This has encouraged 38% of Indian automobile consumers to switch to electric or hybrid cars. Due to this change in the market, many companies, such as Toyota, have planned to introduce electric vehicles in India; and Suzuki has tested almost 50 electric prototypes in India already, according to Mashable.In 2019 Hyundai Launched India's First Electric Car Kona Electric .

Electric vehicle manufacturers in India
 Ather Energy
 Raptee Energy
 Ajanta Group.
 Bajaj Auto
 Oculus Auto
 Hero Electric
 Hyundai
 Mahindra
 Reva, now Mahindra Reva Electric Vehicles.
 MG Motor
 Tara International
 Omega Seiki Mobility
 Tata Motors
 TVS Motor Company
 Revolt Motors
 Ola Electric
 Simple Energy
 Okinawa Autotech
 Ultraviolette Automotive
 Rugged ( A Wholly owned subsidiary of eBikeGo )

 Dandera technologies 

 Euler motors 
 Pravaig Dynamics 
 EKA mobility (EKAM)
 Evage

Growth initiatives

Automotive Research Association of India and standards

The Government of India felt the need for a permanent agency to expedite the publication of standards and development of test facilities in parallel with the work of the preparation of the standards - as the development of improved safety critical parts could be undertaken only after the publication of the standard and commissioning of test facilities. The Ministry of Surface Transport (MoST) constituted a permanent Automotive Industry Standards Committee (AISC) . The Standards prepared by AISC will be approved by the permanent CMVR Technical Standing Committee (CTSC). After approval, the Automotive Research Association of India (ARAI) will publish this standard.

Intelligent Transport Systems (ITS) are globally proven systems to optimize the utilization of existing transport infrastructure and improve transportation systems in terms of efficiency, quality, comfort and safety. Having realized the potential of ITS, Government bodies and other organizations in India are presently working towards implementing various components of ITS across the country.

The first step taken for creation and implementation of ITS was holding a National Workshop titled "User Requirements for Interactive ITS Architecture", which was conducted as a collaboration between SIAM and ASRTU on 26 & 27 February 2015. This was primarily focused on ITS in Public Bus Transportation. Nonetheless, the workshop helped to create the outline for "National Intelligent Transport System Architecture and Policy for Public Transport (Bus)", which was submitted by ASRTU and SIAM to the government

In the 44th & 45th CMVR-TSC, Chairman had directed - standardization activities to be initiated on Intelligent Transportation Systems (ITS) - Vehicle Location Tracking, Camera Surveillance System and Emergency Request Button. The committee intended to extend the above user requirements to all public transportation namely –buses, taxis, etc. The current document covers the requirements for Vehicle Location Tracking and Emergency Button. The other ITS components like PIS, CCTV system, Fare collection etc. are deliberated and would be addressed in later phase and could be added as separate parts to the current document.

Based on these directions, the AISC Panel on ITS has prepared this AIS-140 titled,"Intelligent Transportation Systems (ITS) - Requirements for Public Transport Vehicle Operation". The panel also deliberated and identified the necessary elements for an effective implementation of vehicle level ITS system.

For AIS-140 Devices, in India, connectivity to report location, and Emergency Panic Button signal is though wireless cellular connectivity. There are device focused Cellular Connectivity Offerings like 'eSIM4Things' available in India, which cater to connectivity requirements of AIS-140 devices. eSIM4Things is fully compatible with all AIS-140 devices and with a connectivity manager and a range of tariff plans.

Driverless Technology in India

While there is controversy on possibility of driverless cars in India, many startups are working on this technology:

 Flux Auto
 FishEyeBox
 Hi Tech Robotic Systemz
 EC Mobility Pvt. Ltd.
 ATImotors
 Netradyne
 Swaayat Robots
 Auro Robotics
 OmniPresent Robotics
 Mahindra &  Mahindra
 SeDrica 1.0

In Auto Expo 2018, Hi Tech Robotic Systemz launched an artificial intelligence-based driver behaviour sensor technology called Novus Aware in partnership with Daimler India Commercial Vehicles (DICV).

Performance-linked incentives scheme for future tech 

Automotive sector is part of 13 sectors that GoI has introduced Rs 1.97 lakh cr (US$28 b) performance-linked incentives (PLI) schemes for five years in 2021-22 budget. In Sept 2021, to boost the automotive industry with the newer and green technology the Government of India (GoI) launched 3 PLI schemes, a Rs. 26,000 cr (US$3.61 b) scheme for production of electric vehicles and hydrogen fuel vehicles (PEVHV), the Rs 18,000 crore (US$2.5 b) "Advanced Chemistry Cell" (ACC) scheme for new generation advance storage technologies which are useful for the electric vehicles, and Rs 10,000 crore (US$1.4 b) "Faster Adaption of Manufacturing of Electric Vehicles" (FAME) scheme to go green by expediting production of more electronic vehicles and replacement of other types of existing vehicles with the greener vehicles. The Rs. 26,000 cr (US$3.61 b) PLI scheme to boost automotive sector to boost the production of electric vehicles and hydrogen fuel vehicles will also generate 750,000 direct jobs in auto sector. These schemes will reduce pollution, climate change, carbon footprint, reduce oil and fuel import bill through domestic alternative substitution, boost job creation and economy. Society of Indian Automobile Manufacturers welcomed this as it will enhance the competitiveness and boost growth.

See also
Automobile industry
Automotive Industry Standards, the automotive regulations of India
Electric vehicle industry in India
Electronics and semiconductor manufacturing industry in India
Hydrogen economy in India
Hydrogen internal combustion engine vehicle
Lists of automobile-related articles
List of car brands
List of truck manufacturers
List of motorcycle manufacturers (Category)
List of scooters - List of scooter manufacturers
List of countries by motor vehicle production
List of countries by vehicles per capita
List of Asian cars
List of automobile manufacturers of China
List of Japanese cars
List of vehicle plants in India
List of car magazines

References

Bibliography
 Black, Anthony, et al. "The political economy of automotive industry development policy in middle income countries: A comparative analysis of Egypt, India, South Africa and Turkey." (2020). online
 Dhawan, Rajat, et al. "The auto component industry in India: Preparing for the future." (McKinsey & Company, (Sep 2018). online
 
 Haneesh, Gaddipati Raama, and Abhishek Venkteshwar. "The Impact of Covid-19 on the Automotive Industry in India." International Journal of Management (IJM) 12.4 (2021). online
 Kamala, T.N. & Doreswamy, A.G. (2007). Strategies for Enhancing Competitiveness of Indian Auto Component Industries . Indian Institute of Management Kozhikode.
 
 Remesh, Babu P. "Re-reading the ‘Auto-revolution’in India with a Labour Lens: Shifting Roles and Positions of State, Industry and Workers." in Changing Contexts and Shifting Roles of the Indian State (Springer, Singapore, 2019) pp. 175-189.
 Rengamani, J. "A Study On The Factors Influencing The Job Stress Of Production Engineers In The Automobile Companies In Chennai." International Journal of Mechanical and ProductionEngineering Research and Development (IJMPERD) 8#5 (2018) pp. 427-436 online
 Saha, Priya, And Aruna Sharma. "Creating Value Through Customer Relationship Management In The Automotive Industry In India." CLEAR International Journal of Research in Commerce & Management 11.9 (2020).
 Shrestha, Shahadave. "Supplier development in Indian auto industry: Case of Maruti Suzuki India Limited." The Bulletin of the Graduate School, Soka University 39 (2019): 1-15. online
 Sureshkrishna, G., and D. Simanchala. "Occupational stress and job satisfaction: A Study of Automotive Industry in India." International Journal of Mechanical Engineering and Technology (IJMET) 9.2 (2018): 690-97.
 
 Uppal, Nishant. "CEO narcissism, CEO duality, TMT agreeableness and firm performance: An empirical investigation in auto industry in India." European Business Review'' (2020). online

External links

7 Seater Cars in India in 2023